Mélissa Alves (born 29 December 1993 in Kourou French Guiana) is a French professional squash player. As of October 2018, she was ranked number 139 in the world.

Career
In 2018, she was part of the French team that won the bronze medal at the 2018 Women's World Team Squash Championships.

References

1993 births
Living people
French female squash players
Penn Quakers women's squash players
French people of Brazilian descent
20th-century French women
21st-century French women
Competitors at the 2022 World Games